The Dos Indios River is a river of Santa Catarina state in southeastern Brazil. It is a tributary of the Itajaí do Norte River.

See also
List of rivers of Santa Catarina

References
 Map from Ministry of Transport

Rivers of Santa Catarina (state)